Jolitz is a surname. Notable people with the surname include:

Evan Jolitz (born 1951), American football linebacker
Lynne Jolitz (born 1961), American computer scientist and start-up founder
William Jolitz (born 1957), American software programmer